The Spongetones, formed in 1979, are an American power pop band from Charlotte, North Carolina.  They formed from a desire to play Beatles and other 1960s music they grew up with.

Very much influenced by the British Invasion, the Spongetones carried on the musical genre through acclaimed original songwriting, jangle pop riffs, and lilting vocals of Beatlesque quality.  In his 2007 book, Shake Some Action, John M. Borack rated the Beat and Torn album (a re-release of Beat Music with Torn Apart on DVD) at number 25 of his Top 200 Power Pop Albums of all time, comparing the album to early Beatles and Searchers, calling the album "simply wonderful." Rolling Stone gave Beat Music a 3-1/2 star review and Torn Apart a 3-star review.

Band members
The current members of The Spongetones are:
 Jamie Hoover  (guitars, vocals, occasional bass and drums, songwriting). In addition to his work with The Spongetones, Hoover has toured and recorded with Don Dixon and Marti Jones, The Smithereens, Graham Parker as a member of "The Small Clubs", and produced Americana artist Rebecca Rippy, as well as playing several instruments on both of her releases.  He owned and operated a project studio in Charlotte, NC, called "Hooverama@Liquid Studios". Hoover collaborated with musician Bill Lloyd via "through-the-mail writing".  Hoover either produced or co-produced all the Spongetones' albums. He continues to produce music for other musicians in his private studio. He also works as an instructor for Bold Music, a private music lessons company based in Charlotte, NC.
Steve Stoeckel  (bass, ukulele, vocals, guitars, songwriting). Stoeckel was the band's original bassist. He quit the band in 1985 but rejoined in 1989 and is with the band today. He began playing professionally in the early 70's before becoming a Spongetone. Stoeckel was instrumental in co-writing much of the band's original material and sang lead on a large number of their songs. He and Hoover continue to write and record under the name "Jamie and Steve". In 2016, Stoeckel started a new power pop effort and released a CD under the name Pop Co-Op.
Pat Walters (guitars, vocals and keyboards, songwriting). Walters began playing guitar at an early age; at 14 he was the lead guitarist on The Paragon's  garage-rock classic single, "Abba". Early bands include The Barons, The Paragons, The Good, The Bad & The Ugly and Jeremiah (a band which also included future Wings drummer Denny Seiwell and session guitarist, Dave Spinosa, who played on McCartney's "Ram" LP). While still a teenager, Walters was called on to play lead guitar on an early Aaron Neville single, "Mojo Hannah". He's also played in bands backing such artists as Lesley Gore, Bobby Vee, Tommy Roe and others.
Chris Garges  (drums). Garges joined the Spongetones in 2014 and is presently the band's drummer. He attended the University of Miami's Studio Music and Jazz program, where he specialized in drumset and ethnic percussion. In addition to the Spongetones, Garges has played with Don Dixon, Mitch Easter, and many others. He currently owns and operates Old House Studio in Charlotte, NC.

Past band members:
Rob Thorne (drums, percussion). Thorne was the original Spongetones drummer and was with the band for 33 years. He played his first professional gig at 12 years old (1956) with his father who was a trumpeter for the Les Brown Band of Renown. As a teenager, Thorne joined a band that toured the Chitlin' Circuit backing up all the well known soul artists of the day. He has played with almost every conceivable style music group and spent years doing studio work with many accomplished professional musicians of all genres of music which helped form his versatility. In 2014, he played with Austin, Texas "ace" Honky Tonker, Wink Keziah and The Delux Motel. In 2013, he was inducted into the North Carolina Music Hall of Fame for his work with the Catalinas. Thorne is currently touring with Randy Franklin & The Sardines.
Greg James (bass, keyboards, backing vocals) – James was the Spongetones bassist during 1985 and 1986, when Stoeckel left the band for a time.  This occurred between the releases of Torn Apart and Where-Ever-Land; .  However, James maintained a working relationship with the band thereafter, playing a role in the creation of every Spongetones album from 1987 to 2005, either as a co-writer of original material, or as a session musician (or sometimes both).
Jon Rozzelle (bass) – Rozzelle was the Spongetones bassist from the summer of 1986 until the spring of 1987.

Influences
The band cites the following influences: The Beatles, The Rolling Stones, The Dave Clark 5, The Animals, The Zombies, The Hollies, Manfred Mann, Gerry & The Pacemakers, The Searchers, The Kinks, The Beach Boys, The Yardbirds, The Byrds, Cream, Jimi Hendrix, The Doors, The Who, and Spirit.

Performance highlights
In addition to hundreds of performances in and around Charlotte, NC, the Spongetones played for audiences in other cities.
P. B. Scott's Music Hall, 1983, Blowing Rock, NC. The Spongetones played the last show at P. B. Scott's, which shut down in 1983.
CBGB's, 1984, New York City.
WBCY-108 FM sponsored show, Charlotte, NC, 1984, with special guest, Nicky Hopkins.
Live in Los Angeles, 1998.
Track on "Shoe Fetish: A Tribute to the Shoes", along with Matthew Sweet, Don Dixon, Marti Jones, and others.
ABC World News Now, 2008. Producer David Bandfield asked The Spongetones to write and record a World News Polka. The resulting song  aired on ABC World News Now to a national audience. 
Tokyo, Japan, 2009. Two day promotional tour for Air Mail Recordings.

Reviews
 Under its Top Album Picks, Billboard Magazine said, "The Spongetones bring a heartfelt appreciation to the genre that is positively entertaining." March 24, 1983.
 "One of the things that keeps me listening to rock & roll is its almost magical power of spontaneous generation. As one vine withers away, healthy new shoots appear in the most unlikely places. Among the more promising of the new breed are the SpongeTones, a neo-Merseybeat group from Charlotte, North Carolina. Though the band coalesced out of a pool of local musicians who played Beatles covers at a Charlotte club, the SpongeTones' maiden LP is full of nothing but originals. From the jump to its [Beat Music] opening bars of the beat raver "Here I Go Again" to the woozy, slow-mo psychedelia of "Eloquent Spokesman," the grooves on Beat Music are aglow with a forward-thrusting musical abandon that recalls the glory days of many of the most familiar British Invasion front-liners, including the Beatles, the Dave Clark Five, the Zombies and the Who of "Anyway, Anyhow, Anywhere." But the SpongeTones' music has little of the rote, dogmatic obeisance of mere revivalism; instead, it sounds like the soundtrack to a party so good it could never happen in real life. My favorite cut is "Cool Hearted Girl," which wraps an irresistible guitar hook around a pumping, "She's a Woman"-style tune. But this is the sort of album that'll have twelve different people picking twelve different favorite cuts. Get hip—tune into the SpongeTones." – Parke Puterbaugh, Rolling Stone, Review of Beat Music, September 15, 1983
 "Merseybeat was a brief musical moment on the rock & roll time line, but what a moment. Twenty years later, its trademark jangling guitars and high harmonies can still induce instant nostalgia for the irrecoverable innocence of that era. North Carolina's SpongeTones have the sound of the first British invasion down cold, as they demonstrated on their debut album, Beat Music, and on Torn Apart, their new, six song EP, they offer further proof that they can write, too. The SpongeTones' main aural icons are the Beatles, of course. The yearning vocal that rises above the whining combo organ and lagged beat of "Lana-NaNa" is eerily Lennon-esque, and there's good, dumb fun to be had inserting your own head shaking oohs into the exhilarating "Have You Ever Been Torn Apart?" Equally neat are the lovely "Now Your Gone," with its crispy strummed acoustic guitar, and (My Girl) Maryanne," which conjures up the gorgeous fizz of peak-period Hollies. Not every song works: "Shock Therapy," a respectable rocker that does not partake of the Mersey canon, sounds out of place in these highly stylized surroundings, and "Annie Dear," which evokes the playful mannerisms of Paul McCartney, may seem less than lovable to those who feel that Paulie's particular brand of whimsy played itself out long ago. For the most part, though, the SpongeTones' delightful tributes to the mist-shrouded Mersey era are so well crafted that they might well have been hits back then. Certainly they deserve to be heard here and now. " – Kurt Loder, Rolling Stone, Review of Torn Apart, May 10, 1984
 In their article, Power Pop 101, The A.V. Club says that "She Goes Out With Everybody" is the best Merseybeat song ever written and recorded by an American band.
 Chris Woodstra (Allmusic) called the Spongetones' albums "effortlessly catchy." Woodstra wrote that 1995's Textural Drone Thing was more subtle than the Spongetones' other albums.
 "The SpongeTones are without a doubt the finest example of pure, unadulterated Beatlesque joy to emanate from the indie pop underground." – Goldmine Magazine, November 2006.

Discography
See the complete Spongetones discography, including foreign releases

Albums
 Beat Music (1982)
 Torn Apart (1984 – mini LP) (R.E.M. were recording their second album, Reckoning, in Studio A of Reflection Studios in Charlotte, North Carolina; the Spongetones were using Studio C. Bill Berry, Peter Buck and Mike Mills of R.E.M. and their producers, Mitch Easter and Don Dixon, were asked if they would add handclaps to the track 'Shock Therapy'.)
 Where-Ever Land (1987) 
 Oh Yeah! (1991)
 Textural Drone Thing (1995)
 Odd Fellows (2000)
 Beat The Spongetones (2002) – Released demos
 Number 9 (2005)
 Too Clever By Half (2008)
 Scrambled Eggs (2009)

Compilations
 Welcome to Comboland: A Collection of Twelve Artists From North Carolina (1986), which also included songs by The Connells, The Othermothers and Fetchin' Bones
 Beat & Torn (1994) (compiles Beat Music and Torn Apart, + one bonus track)
 Mersey Christmas (2002) (compiles Christmas-themed fan-club releases)
 Beat the Spongetones (2005) (compiles early demo recordings)
 Always Carry On: The Best of the Spongetones (2007)

Jamie Hoover Solo Efforts  
 Coupons, Questions and Comments (1990)
 Jamie Hoo-Ever (2004)
 Lind Me Four (2006)
 Most Loved Melodies (2006 – compilation)
 Jamie Two Ever (2014)

Jamie Hoover and Steve Stoeckel ("Jamie and Steve")  
Jamie Hoover and Steve Stoeckel continue to work together, writing and recording new music.
 English Afterthoughts (2009) 
 The Next Big Thing (2011) 
English Afterthoughts, Japanese Release (2012), Compilation of English Afterthoughts and The Next Big Thing.
 Imaginary Cafe (2013) 
 Circling (2014)

Jamie Hoover and Bill Lloyd
 Paparazzi (2004)

Pop Co-Op (Steve Stoeckel)
 Four State Solution (2017)Factory Settings (2020)Footnotes

References
 Borack, John M. (2007). Shake Some Action. Not Lame.  
 Billboard, March 24, 2001, p. 55.
 Rolling Stone, September 15, 1983, p. 61; May 10, 1984, p. 56.
 Washington Post'', April 22, 1988, p. N23.

External links
 Official Spongetones website

Musical groups established in 1981
American power pop groups
Musical groups from North Carolina